SS Meteor (MC hull number 292, Type C2-S-B1) was built by the Moore Drydock Co. in Oakland, CA in 1943, and upon completion of construction was pressed into service as a War Shipping Administration (WSA) troop transport vessel. The ship was operated by Mississippi Shipping Company as agents for WSA. It transported troops throughout the Pacific Ocean from 1943 through 1945. It traveled from California to locations such as Hawaii, Eniwetok, Ulithi, Okinawa, Saipan and Guam, among others.

After the war the ship entered the James River reserve fleet on 19 April 1946. Meteor was reconverted to civilian use during early to mid 1947 and sold 12 December 1947 to U.S. Lines to be renamed American Miller. The ship was sold 23 July 1969 to Amercargo Shipping Company. The ship was scrapped in Taiwan 6 March 1970.

References

1943 ships
Ships built in Oakland, California
Troop ships of the War Shipping Administration